Zürich Stadelhofen FB railway station is a tram stop on the Stadelhoferplatz in Zürich, Switzerland. It is located in front of the Zürich Stadelhofen mainline railway station. Lines 8, 11, and 15 of the Zürich tram network stop here.

Layout 

Passengers board trams or S18 trains from one of three stop locations on the streets encircling the Stadelhoferplatz. Tram lines  8, 11, and 15 stop on the exterior of the loop. The S18 comes off the Kreuzbühlstrasse and terminates along the interior of the loop. Another stop, Opernhaus, is located across the side on the Seefeldstrasse and is served by tram lines 2 and 4.

Services 
 the following services stop at Zürich Stadelhofen FB:

References

External links 
 
 Haltestelleninfos – Forchbahn 

Stadelhofen FB
Tram stops in Zürich